The Carrollton City School District is a public school district in Carroll County, Georgia, United States, based in and serving the city of Carrollton.

History

Schools
The Carrollton City School District has one lower elementary school, an upper elementary school, a junior high school, and a high school.

Elementary school
Carrollton Elementary School

Upper elementary school
Carrollton Upper Elementary School

Junior high school
Carrollton Junior High School

High school
Carrollton High School

Awards
The Carrollton Board of Education has won the Exemplary Board of Achievement award for six consecutive years by the Georgia School Boards Association.

Campus
All four schools, athletic fields, and additional facilities including the performing arts center and school board office are located together on a unified 130-acre campus at the intersections of Ben Scott Boulevard, Tom Reeve Drive, and Trojan Drive.

Facilities

Grisham Stadium 

Grisham Stadium serves as the main home field for many athletic teams in the school district.

Mabry Arts Center 
The Mabry Arts Center opened in 2010 and serves as a multi-purpose theater for school concerts, plays, musicals, visual art exhibitions, and additional community meetings.

Pope-McGinnis Student Activity Center 
The Student Activity Center was built in 2019 to accommodate various athletic needs of the district. The facility houses an auxiliary basketball court, weightlifting room and the only regulation-sized indoor football field in the state of Georgia.

References

External links
Carrollton City School District

School districts in Georgia (U.S. state)
Education in Carroll County, Georgia
School districts established in 1886
1886 establishments in Georgia (U.S. state)